Gianbattista Grancino or Giovanni Battista Grancino (born 1673 – died ca.1730) was a member of the family of luthiers Grancino (in German). Other members included Giovanni Grancino, Andrea Grancino, Francesco Grancino and Paolo Grancino.

Their instruments were played by Yehudi Menuhin (violin), Donald Hazelwood (violin), Ladislav Černý (viola), Siegfried Palm (cello) and Adrian Beers (double bass), among others.

See also
Grancino
Giovanni Grancino
Paolo Grancino

References

1673 births
Year of death unknown
Italian luthiers